Nuno Henrique Gonçalves Nogueira (born 19 October 1986), known as Henrique, is a Portuguese professional footballer who plays for Lusitânia F.C. as a central defender.

Club career
Henrique was born in Fafe, Braga District. After completing his youth career at the club he made his senior debut with AD Fafe, playing three seasons in the third division. In summer 2008 he joined C.D. Aves of the Segunda Liga, being almost exclusively a backup during his spell.

Henrique played with C.D. Feirense in 2010–11, starting in 18 of his league appearances and scoring three goals as the club returned to the Primeira Liga after 22 years. In the ensuing off-season he signed for S.C. Braga for three years, being immediately loaned to his previous team and being rarely used as the campaign ended in relegation (ten competitive matches, due to injury).

On 28 June 2012, after buying out his Braga contract, Henrique joined Académica de Coimbra on a two-year deal. In the last minutes of the summer transfer window, however, he moved to the Football League Championship with Blackburn Rovers, sharing teams with several compatriots including former Braga teammate Nuno Gomes.

On 1 July 2013, Henrique signed for F.C. Arouca in his country's top division, on a season-long loan. He returned to Ewood Park in January of the following year and, on 28 February, moved to Jagiellonia Białystok of the Polish Ekstraklasa. During this timeframe, where he also represented F.C. Penafiel and Feirense, his career was marred by several injury problems.

From 2015 to 2018, Henrique competed in the Portuguese top tier with Boavista FC. He scored five goals from 52 competitive appearances during his spell at the Estádio do Bessa.

Club statistics

References

External links

1986 births
Living people
People from Fafe
Sportspeople from Braga District
Portuguese footballers
Association football defenders
Primeira Liga players
Liga Portugal 2 players
Segunda Divisão players
AD Fafe players
C.D. Aves players
C.D. Feirense players
S.C. Braga players
Associação Académica de Coimbra – O.A.F. players
F.C. Arouca players
F.C. Penafiel players
Boavista F.C. players
Lusitânia F.C. players
Blackburn Rovers F.C. players
Jagiellonia Białystok players
Portuguese expatriate footballers
Expatriate footballers in England
Expatriate footballers in Poland
Portuguese expatriate sportspeople in England
Portuguese expatriate sportspeople in Poland